Gublyukuchukovo (Göblökösök) is a rural locality (a selo) in Takarlikovsky Selsoviet, Dyurtyulinsky District, Bashkortostan, Russia. The population was 392 as of 2010. There are 8 streets.

Geography 
Gublyukuchukovo is located 5 km west of Dyurtyuli (the district's administrative centre) by road. Ivanayevo is the nearest rural locality.

References 

Rural localities in Dyurtyulinsky District